The Weekly Recorder is a 120-year-old weekly newspaper in Claysville, Pennsylvania, US. It has been printed every week except for one three-month period in 1960s.

It was founded by a Mr. Irwin, who sold it in its first year to the Melvin family. George Melvin sold it in the 1960s, after briefly closing it, to Gene Shaw. Shaw ran the company till 1973, when he sold it to "Buck" and Betty Jones. They continued the newspaper until the sold in 1982 to Douglas Teagarden. Teagarden ran the paper until 2002 when he sold it Cody Knotts. 
Until that time, the paper concentrated on the news of the McGuffey School District in Southwestern Pennsylvania. Afterwards, it switched format and become an investigative tabloid concentrating on politics and crime.

In 2010, Knotts was the Republican nominee for Pennsylvania's 48th House District. He used his position as owner of The Weekly Recorder to promote himself and his candidacy. He also repeatedly attacked his opponent, Democrat Brandon Neuman, in the pages of the paper. Neuman defeated Knotts for the seat; the final vote tally was 10,481 to 9,441.

In early August 2011, Knotts sold the Weekly Recorder to its current owners, DFM Publishers. DFM has continued to carry political news, but has also been focusing on a wider variety of content such as sports, arts and entertainment, fitness, etc. They have also expanded the content and distribution into other counties in Southwestern PA. The paper now has an interactive website that is updated frequently and allows users to chat and view past issues.

References

External links
 The Weekly Recorder website

Newspapers published in Pennsylvania
Weekly newspapers published in the United States